Chavakachcheri ( Cāvakaccēri,  Jāvakachchēri) is a large town in the Jaffna peninsula of Jaffna District, Northern Province, Sri Lanka. It may have Javanese origins, as the name "Chaavaka+cheari" literally means Javanese settlement (there are also some references to a Javanese fort in northern Sri Lanka). The town may date back to the Southeast Asian occupation of Yalpanam, where certain settlements and forts were established by Chandrabhanu to maintain hegemony over the overseas colony. The town is governed by an Urban Council. Chavakachcheri was badly devastated in the Sri Lankan Civil War. Today, the government and the people of Chavakachcheri have rebuilt the town, but the population remains drastically lower than the pre-war years.

The 111-year-old Chavakachcheri Hindu College, a high school, is a leading centre of education in the town.

References

External links 
 Javanese History, Spread of Javanese Rule from Madagascar to South Pacific
The Civil Wars of Sri Lanka during 13th to 15th Century
Wars waged for the Possession of the Tooth Relic
Chaavakachcheari Etymology

 
Towns in Jaffna District
Thenmarachchi DS Division